Ust-Alexeyevo is a rural locality (a selo) and the administrative center of Ust-Alexeyevskoye Rural Settlement, Velikoustyugsky District, Vologda Oblast, Russia. The population was 1,147 as of 2002. There are 19 streets.

Geography 
Ust-Alexeyevo is located 54 km southeast of Veliky Ustyug (the district's administrative centre) by road. Gorbishchevo is the nearest rural locality.

References 

Rural localities in Velikoustyugsky District